John Edward Illsley (born 24 June 1949) is an English musician, best known as bass guitarist of the rock band Dire Straits. With it, he has received multiple BRIT and Grammy Awards, and a Heritage Award.

As one of the founding band members, with guitarist brothers Mark and David Knopfler, and drummer Pick Withers, Illsley played a role in the development of Dire Straits' sound.  By the time the group disbanded in 1995 changes in personnel meant that Illsley and lead singer Mark Knopfler were the only two original band members remaining. Illsley was inducted into the Rock and Roll Hall of Fame as a member of Dire Straits in 2018.

Illsley has produced two albums of his own, with Mark Knopfler as a guest musician, and has helped with Mark's personal projects and charities. He released two more albums, influenced by the Celtic-based band Cunla.

Biography

Early life
Illsley's childhood memories include searching for sticklebacks in the River Jordan in Little Bowden (near Market Harborough), with friends. Illsley attended Bromsgrove School, Worcestershire and a Further Education College near Kettering, Northamptonshire, before starting work as a management trainee for a timber firm. He then studied Sociology at Goldsmiths College, University of London and opened a record shop with his girlfriend.

While in London, he roomed with David Knopfler. Illsley was introduced to David's older brother, Mark, who had just undergone a marital breakup and was playing music in the pubs nearby. Illsley recounts returning home very early one morning, and "walked into the lounge room, and saw this figure lying on the floor... asleep ... with a guitar over his legs, and he'd... fallen asleep on the floor while he was playing... his head was sort of cranked back, and there was an ashtray with cigarette butts and coffee on the floor... ", and that was how the two first encountered one another.

David Knopfler was keen to start a band and approached his roommate. Illsley already played bass guitar and had the same interest.  Convinced that they could make a go of it, with David's brother Mark as lead guitarist and vocalist, David playing rhythm guitar, Illsley on bass, and Pick Withers, a friend, as drummer, the four set about forming a band, eventually named Dire Straits which according to rumour is because they gave up their day jobs and were in financial "dire straits" by the time their band became popular. However, David Knopfler denies this on his personal website: "The notion that the band were literally in dire straits is largely retrospective myth making and not really factually supportable. We all had day jobs until we got a whacking big advance from Polygram." In contrast, Illsley himself said,"We were living on next to nothing and weren't even able to pay the gas bill." He added that they "weren't called Dire Straits for nothing".

Dire Straits

As well as playing bass on all the Dire Straits recordings, Illsley also contributed backing vocals, with David Knopfler, and both harmonized to Mark's lead vocals and guitar in concert, and on the band's first two studio albums, Dire Straits and Communiqué.

During a period when most major labels expected bands to compose and record one to two albums per year, as well as tour to support them, tensions grew within the band between David Knopfler, and his elder brother Mark. Mark wrote nearly every song, was the frontman in the band, and had, in a short time, become a virtuoso on the guitar. During the recording sessions for their third project, Making Movies, the stress between the Knopfler brothers after nearly non-stop recording, touring, and publicity took its toll on the band, and David left the band over creative differences with his brother, who had assumed the role of "de facto" leader.

The band hired Hal Lindes to replace David, who stayed with the band for five years, and keyboards were also added when Alan Clark joined the band in 1980. Although the band's lineup continued to change, Illsley remained in his role as bassist, and provided the harmony and backing vocals with the other bandmates. Throughout it all, Illsley and Mark Knopfler were the only founding members to remain in the lineup of Dire Straits right through from 1977 until the group's dissolution in 1995. Illsley unsuccessfully tried to persuade Mark Knopfler to reform the group in October 2008.  In his November 2021 autobiography My Life in Dire Straits, Illsley confirms that Knopfler has no interest in reforming Dire Straits.

Before Dire Straits disbanded, Illsley released two solo albums of his own, Never Told a Soul (1984) and  Glass (1988). Knopfler contributed some of the guitar parts on both.

Cunla
In March 2005, in a pub in Leicestershire, Illsley happened upon an Irish Celtic rock group, Cunla. For the first time since 1993 he took to the stage and played a couple of Dire Straits numbers with the band. Cunla subsequently played at a summer party Illsley was hosting in Hampshire. He then appeared with them on several occasions, most notably on 23 September 2006 at Cathedrale d'Image in Les Baux de Provence, France. This performance was recorded and subsequently released as an album in 2007. With Illsley, they covered a couple of Dire Straits numbers, albeit in an Irish style, with Johnny Owens replacing all keyboards and brass parts with traditional Irish violin. They also have a large amount of their own material, much of it penned by Greg Pearle.

In October 2008, Illsley released an album, Beautiful You, and embarked on a tour of Ireland with singer–songwriter Greg Pearle. This would be Illsley's fourth solo album, and the second one released without the assistance of Mark Knopfler. Illsley collaborated with Pearle and Paul Brady on the song "One" and featured in the accompanying music video (2008). "One" was also the theme song for the Irish film Anton.

Personal life
Illsley now lives in Hampshire, with his second wife Stephanie and his four children. He also spends time at his home in Provence, France. He owns a local pub, the 'East End Arms', located in the hamlet of East End between Lymington and Beaulieu, and which has been listed by critics as one of the "Fifty Best Pubs Around Britain". He is also a partner in two nearby hotels: The Master Builder's House Hotel near Beaulieu and The George Hotel on the Isle of Wight. Illsley is a keen painter and the first exhibition of his work was shown at the Nevill Keating McIlroy Gallery, Pickering Place, London in 2007.

In August 2014, Illsley was one of 200 public figures who were signatories to a letter to The Guardian opposing Scottish independence in the run-up to September's referendum on that issue.

In 2019 Illsley appeared in the final episode of BBC's Rick Stein’s Secret France where he dined with Rick Stein at a restaurant near his home in Provence. In November 2021, Illsley published his autobiography, My Life in Dire Straits.

Solo discography

Studio albums 
 1984 – Never Told a Soul
 1988 – Glass
 2008 – Beautiful You (with Greg Pearle)
 2010 – Streets of Heaven
 2014 – Testing the Water
 2016 – Long Shadows
 2019 – Coming Up for Air
 2022 – VIII

Live  albums 
 2007 – Live in Les Baux de Provence (with Cunla and Greg Pearle)
 2014 – Live in London

References

Further reading

External links

Official website
Interview on the Leicester Bands website
East End Arms

1949 births
Living people
Dire Straits members
English rock bass guitarists
Male bass guitarists
People educated at Bromsgrove School
Alumni of Goldsmiths, University of London
Vertigo Records artists
People from Leicester